This lists ranks the tallest structures in Prague that stand at least  tall. The list contains all types of structures.

References

See also 
 List of tallest buildings in Prague
 List of tallest buildings in the Czech Republic

Lists of buildings and structures in the Czech Republic
Prague-related lists
Buildings and structures in Prague